Vadim Anatolyevich Khamuttskikh (26 November 1969 – 31 December 2021) was a Russian volleyball player, who was a member of the men's national team that won the silver medal at the 2000 Summer Olympics in Sydney, Australia and the 2007 European Championship in Moscow, Russia. There he was named Best Setter of the tournament.

Khamuttskikh also competed at the 2004 Summer Olympics in Athens, Greece, where Russia claimed the bronze medal by defeating the United States in the play-off for the third place, and at the 2008 Summer Olympics in Beijing, China. He also competed at the 1996 Summer Olympics. He died on 31 December 2021, at the age of 52.

Individual awards
 2007 European Championship Best Setter

References

Sources

External links
 
 
 

1969 births
2021 deaths
People from Ashinsky District
Russian men's volleyball players
Volleyball players at the 1996 Summer Olympics
Volleyball players at the 2000 Summer Olympics
Volleyball players at the 2004 Summer Olympics
Volleyball players at the 2008 Summer Olympics
Olympic volleyball players of Russia
Olympic silver medalists for Russia
Olympic bronze medalists for Russia
Olympic medalists in volleyball
Medalists at the 2008 Summer Olympics
Medalists at the 2004 Summer Olympics
Medalists at the 2000 Summer Olympics
Sportspeople from Chelyabinsk Oblast